The North Kent Line is a railway line which branches off the South East Main Line at St Johns junction west of Lewisham station in Greater London and runs to Rochester Bridge Junction near Strood, Medway where it links to the Chatham Main Line.

The section from Charlton to Dartford is also referred to as the "Woolwich Line" in the context of Southeastern Metro services.

History

Construction
The North Kent Line was the means by which the South Eastern Railway (SER) was able to connect its system to London at London Bridge. In 1846 the SER purchased the Thames and Medway Canal tunnel near Higham and laid railway tracks through it; in 1847 trains were working through from the Strood terminus, on the River Medway to Gravesend. From 30 July 1849 the line was extended, via Blackheath, to a junction with the London and Greenwich Railway at North Kent East Junction, near Deptford, and through trains were now able to operate.

Electrification
The line is electrified (750 V DC third rail). Electrification was initially to Dartford (6 June 1926) and was extended to Gillingham by World War Two.

Former services
From 1999 until 2002, there were semi-fast trains running from Plumstead to London Victoria, temporarily resuming a 1980s service pattern. This service was for the Millennium Dome; trains called at Woolwich Arsenal, Charlton, Blackheath, Lewisham, Peckham Rye, then ran non-stop to London Victoria. There was also an early morning semi-fast service to London Blackfriars from Dartford in the 1980s.

In 2003, there were plans to run a Plumstead to Clapham Junction service across South London which had never came to fruition.

Until May 2018, there were regular semi-fast services to Gillingham (Kent) from London Charing Cross via Lewisham (for DLR) and Woolwich Arsenal (for DLR) operated by Southeastern calling at Waterloo East, London Bridge then non-stop to Lewisham (for DLR), Blackheath, Charlton, Woolwich Arsenal (for DLR), Abbey Wood (for Elizabeth line), Dartford, Greenhithe (for Bluewater), Gravesend and then all stations to Gillingham (Kent). Since then, these services were replaced by the new Thameslink services from Luton calling at all but some stations to Rainham (Kent).

Route
The line diverges from the Southeastern Main Line at Lewisham Vale junction at the country end of St John's station at the edge of Inner London, and runs as far as Rochester Bridge junction beside the River Medway by the north coast of historic mid-Kent.

Services
The North Kent Line is a high-frequency line, with all stations in the London area being served by at least 4 trains per hour, with Lewisham having 14tph.

London Charing Cross to  2tph, calling at Waterloo East,  fast to Lewisham (for DLR), Blackheath, Charlton, Woolwich Dockyard, Woolwich Arsenal (for DLR), Abbey Wood (for the Elizabeth Line) Belvedere, Erith, Slade Green and Dartford.

London Cannon Street to  all stations via Greenwich 4tph, of which 2tph continue back to Cannon Street via Bexleyheath and Lewisham on the Bexleyheath line and 2tph to Cannon Street via Sidcup and Hither Green on the Dartford Loop Line.

 to  2tph, Semi Fast calling all stations to West Hampstead Thameslink, St Pancras International, Farringdon, City Thameslink, London Blackfriars, London Bridge, Deptford, Greenwich (for DLR), Maze Hill, Westcombe Park, Charlton, Woolwich Arsenal (for DLR), Plumstead, Abbey Wood (for the Elizabeth Line), Slade Green, Dartford, Stone Crossing, Greenhithe 
(for Bluewater), Swanscombe, Northfleet, Gravesend and all stations to Rainham.

Service patterns

, the service pattern is:

Off-peak & Saturday:
2tph between Luton & Rainham via Greenwich (Semi-Fast)
2tph between London Cannon Street & Slade Green via Greenwich, continuing to London Cannon Street via the Bexleyheath Line (stopping service)(Also runs 2tph via Bexleyheath first and then via Greenwich)
2tph between London Cannon Street & Slade Green via Greenwich, continuing to London Cannon Street via the Dartford Loop Line (stopping service)(Also runs 2tph via the Dartford Loop Line first and then via Greenwich)
2tph between London Charing Cross & Dartford via Lewisham & Woolwich Arsenal
2tph between London Charing Cross & Dartford via Bexleyheath
2tph between London Charing Cross &  via Dartford Loop Line (Fast service)
2tph between London Charing Cross & Dartford via Dartford Loop Line (Semi-Fast)
2tph between St Pancras International & , continuing to St Pancras International via the Kent Coast Line and High Speed One, via High Speed One

Sunday:
2tph between London Cannon Street & Dartford via Greenwich (stopping service)
2tph between London Charing Cross & Dartford via Lewisham and Woolwich Arsenal
2tph between Kentish Town & Rainham via Greenwich (Semi-Fast)

Peak hour frequencies vary, with services from the Bexleyheath and Dartford loop lines also running to and from stations to Gillingham.

Future
Abbey Wood station has been rebuilt to become the eastern terminus of the Elizabeth Line. However, a possible extension of the Elizabeth line to Gravesend has been safeguarded.

Stations

Train services working the Line today take the following route; the first ten miles (16 km) passes through many tunnels, included on the list:
 Lewisham
 Blackheath – here is the junction for the Bexleyheath Line
 Blackheath Tunnel [1 mile (1.6 km) in length]
 here is the freight branch to Angerstein Wharf
 junction for the line from Greenwich and the eastern connection with the London and Greenwich Railway, opened in 1878
 Charlton
 Charlton Tunnel [154 yd (138 m)]
 Mount Street Tunnel [121 yd (108 m)]
 Dockyard Tunnel [121 yd (108 m)]
 Woolwich Dockyard
 Coleman Street Tunnel [89 yd(80 m)]
 George IV Tunnel [238 yd (214 m]
 Calderwood Street Tunnel [58 yd (52 m)]
 Cross Street Tunnel [134 yd (120 m)]
 Woolwich Arsenal
 Plumstead – here the Royal Arsenal railway system connected with the main line
 Church Manor Way Halt – closed
 Abbey Wood
 Belvedere
 Erith
 Slade Green -includes the large carriage-servicing depot
 here is the triangular junction with the Bexleyheath Line
 here is the triangular junction with the Dartford Loop Line
 Dartford
 Stone Crossing
 Greenhithe, subtitled "for Bluewater"
 Greenhithe Tunnel [253 yd (228 m)]
 Swanscombe
 Northfleet – this station is only 305m or so from Ebbsfleet International c. 800m by foot.
 Gravesend: was originally named Gravesend Central to differentiate it from the ex-London, Chatham and Dover Railway station at Gravesend West which closed in 1968
 Milton Road Halt-closed
 Denton Halt- closed
 Milton Range Halt-closed
 Hoo Junction Staff Halt, where the line branches ("The Hundred of Hoo Railway") to Grain. Currently for freight services (not electrified)
 Higham
 Strood – the junction for the Medway Valley Line.

The North Kent Line connects with the LCDR Chatham Main Line at Rochester Bridge Junction, about 200 m beyond Strood station. It totals some 30 miles (48 km) in length.

References

External links

Transport in the London Borough of Bexley
Transport in the Borough of Dartford
Transport in the Royal Borough of Greenwich
Rail transport in Kent
Transport in the London Borough of Lewisham
Railway lines in London
Transport in Medway
Railway lines in South East England
Standard gauge railways in Kent
Standard gauge railways in London